Wynford Middle School/High School is a public middle school and high school near Bucyrus, Ohio, United States, in Holmes Township. It serves all students in grades six through twelve in the Wynford Local School District. The school was established in 1963 as Wynford High School for grades nine through twelve and was combined with the middle school in 2020 after the completion of the current facilities on the same campus. Athletic teams are known as the Royals and the school colors are royal blue and gray.

Athletics

State championships
 Boys Track and Field – 1954

External links

References

High schools in Crawford County, Ohio
Public high schools in Ohio
Public middle schools in Ohio